Mineral Wells Independent School District is a public school district based in Mineral Wells, Texas (USA). M.W.I.S.D. is a TEA Recognized School District. The district operates under the elementary schools Lamar, which serves Preschool through first grade, Houston, which serves second and third grade, and Travis, which serves fourth through sixth grade, as well as Mineral Wells Junior High and Mineral Wells High school.

Located in Palo Pinto County, a very small part of the district extends into Parker County.

The district changed to a four day school week in fall 2022.

References

External links
Mineral Wells ISD

School districts in Palo Pinto County, Texas
School districts in Parker County, Texas